The 2001 Slovak Figure Skating Championships took place in Ružomberok between December 16 and 17, 2000. Skaters competed in the disciplines of men's singles, ladies' singles, pair skating, and ice dancing on the senior level.

Results

Men

Ladies

Pairs

Ice dancing

External links
 results

2000 in figure skating
Slovak Figure Skating Championships, 2001
Slovak Figure Skating Championships
2000 in Slovak sport
Slovak Figure Skating Championships, 2001